Raymond Kemp (born 13 September 1946) is a South African former cricketer. He played in one List A and seven first-class matches for Border from 1967/68 to 1977/78.

See also
 List of Border representative cricketers

References

External links
 

1946 births
Living people
South African cricketers
Border cricketers
People from Queenstown, South Africa
Cricketers from the Eastern Cape